Bulbophyllum lageniforme, commonly known as the smooth strand orchid, is a species of epiphytic or lithophytic orchid that is endemic to tropical North Queensland. It has flattened, pale green, grooved, clump-forming pseudobulbs, stiff, dark green leaves and up to four cream-coloured or pale green flowers with a pink labellum. It usually grows on shrubs, trees and rocks in highland rainforest.

Description
Flowering occurs between November and February.

Taxonomy and naming
Bulbophyllum lageniforme was first formally described in 1904 by Frederick Manson Bailey and the description was published in the Queensland Agricultural Journal from a specimen collected near the summit of Mount Bellenden Ker. The specific epithet (lageniforme) is derived from the Latin words lagena meaning "a large jar or bottle with handles and a narrow neck" and forma meaning "shape", "figure" or "model".

Distribution and habitat
The smooth strand orchid grows on trees and rocks in rainforest and in sheltered places in drier forests. It occurs between the Mount Finnigan and the headwaters of the Tully River in Queensland.

References 

lageniforme
Orchids of Queensland
Endemic orchids of Australia
Plants described in 1904